Robert Rutherford Beatty (19 October 1909 – 3 March 1992) was a Canadian actor who worked in film, television and radio for most of his career and was especially known in the UK.

Early years
Beatty was born in Hamilton, Ontario, the son of Charles Thompson Beatty and Blanch Sarah Rutherford. He attended Delta Collegiate School and earned a bachelor of arts degree from the University of Toronto.

He began his acting career in Britain in 1939.

Career

Stage
Beatty joined the Players' Guild of Hamilton after graduation from the University of Toronto. He went to London, England, in 1936 and joined the Royal Academy of Dramatic Art. It was with the RADA that he made his English stage debut. In 1939 he appeared in the West End in N.C. Hunter's comedy Grouse in June.

Film
Beatty's film credits include: San Demetrio London (1943), Odd Man Out (1947), Another Shore (1948), Against the Wind (1948), Captain Horatio Hornblower R.N. (1951), The Square Ring (1953), Postmark for Danger (1955),  Something of Value (1957),The Amorous Prawn (1962), 2001: A Space Odyssey (1968), Where Eagles Dare (1968), The Pink Panther Strikes Again (1976), Superman III (1983), Minder on the Orient Express (1985) and Superman IV: The Quest for Peace (1987).

Beatty appeared in two "critically acclaimed war propaganda films" in 1942 – 49th Parallel and  One of Our Aircraft Is Missing.

Television
In the 1950s, he was host of the BBC programme Saturday Night Out, a live outside-broadcast magazine programme, in which he was known as "The Man with the Mike". In 1958, he played Detective Inspector Mike Maguire in the police series Dial 999 (a co-production between Britain's ABC and the US company Ziv). He also appeared in Doctor Who ("The Tenth Planet" as General Cutler), Blake's 7 ("The Way Back" as Bran Foster), The Gathering Storm, Thriller (1976), The New Avengers, and Minder. He was in Franco Zeffirelli's TV mini-series Jesus of Nazareth and the American series of Ray Bradbury's The Martian Chronicles.  He portrayed Ronald Reagan in Breakthrough at Reykjavik (Granada Television UK 1987).

Radio
Beatty reported descriptions of the Blitz from London to North America via the BBC during World War II. He played Philip Odell, a fictional Irish detective created by Lester Powell, between 1947 and 1961. The series debuted on BBC radio with the story "Lady in a Fog" in October 1947. The series was made available to overseas broadcasters by the BBC Transcription Services. His other radio credits included Shadow of Sumuru on the BBC Home Programme in 1945–46, Shadow Man on Radio Luxembourg in 1955, Destination – Fire! Stories of a Fire Investigator on the BBC Light Programme (1962-1966), General Sternwood in a BBC version of Raymond Chandler's The Big Sleep (1977), Pay Any Price (BBC 1982), The Mystery of the Blue Train (BBC 1985/1986), and as Henry Hickslaughter in Elizabeth Troop's Sony Award winning adaptation of Graham Greene's short story Cheap In August (1993).

Death
Beatty died March 3, 1992, in London and was cremated at Putney Vale Crematorium.

Filmography

 Black Limelight (1939) as Extra (uncredited)
 Murder in Soho (1939) as Jack (uncredited)
 Dangerous Moonlight (1941) as Reporter with Carol (uncredited)
 49th Parallel (1941) as RCMP Mountie in Alberta (voice, uncredited)
 One of Our Aircraft Is Missing (1942) as Sgt. Hopkins
 Suspected Person (1942) as Franklin
 Flying Fortress (1942) as Connor (uncredited)
 The First of the Few (1942) as American Airman (uncredited)
 San Demetrio London (1943) as 'Yank' Preston
 It Happened One Sunday (1944) as Tom Stevens
 A Matter of Life and Death (1946) as US Crewman (uncredited)
 Appointment with Crime (1946) as Det. Insp. Rogers
 Odd Man Out (1947) as Dennis
 Green Fingers (1947) as Thomas Stone
 Against the Wind (1948) as Father Philip
 Counterblast (1948) as Dr. Paul Rankin
 Another Shore (1948) as Gulliver
 Portrait from Life (1948) as Campbell Reid
 The Twenty Questions Murder Mystery (1950) as Bob Beacham
 Her Favourite Husband (1950) as Antonio Pellegrini
 Captain Horatio Hornblower R.N. (1951) as Lt. William Bush
 Calling Bulldog Drummond (1951) as Arthur Gunns
 The Magic Box (1951) as Lord Beaverbrook
 Wings of Danger (1952) as Nick Talbot
 The Gentle Gunman (1952) as Shinto
 The Broken Horseshoe (1953) as Dr. Mark Fenton
 The Net (1953) as Maj. Sam Seagram
 Man on a Tightrope (1953) as Barovic
 The Oracle (1953) as Bob Jefferson
 The Square Ring (1953) as Kid Curtis
 Albert R.N. (1953) as Jim
 Loves of Three Queens (1954) as Menelao (segment: The Face That Launched a Thousand Ships)
 Out of the Clouds (1955) as Nick Millbourne
 Portrait of Alison (1955) as Tim Forrester
 Tarzan and the Lost Safari (1957) as Tusker Hawkins
 Something of Value (1957) as Elizabeth's Husband – Jeff Newton
 Time Lock (1957) as Pete Dawson
 The Shakedown (1960) as Chief Insp. Bob Jarvis
 Invitation to Murder (1962) 
 The Amorous Prawn (1962) as Larry Hoffman
 The Secret of Dr. Mabuse (1964) as Col. Matson
 The 25th Hour (1967) as Col. Greenfield
 Bikini Paradise (1967) as Commissioner 
 2001: A Space Odyssey (1968) as Dr. Ralph Halvorsen
 Where Eagles Dare (1968) as General George Carnaby / Corporal Cartwright Jones
 Sitting Target (1972) as Gun Dealer
 Pope Joan (1972) as Dr. Corwin
 The Spikes Gang (1974) as Sheriff (credit only)
 The Gathering Storm (1974) as Lord Beaverbrook
 The Pink Panther Strikes Again (1976) as U.S. Admiral
 Jesus of Nazareth (1977, TV Mini-Series) as Proculus
 Golden Rendezvous (1977) as Dr. Taubman
 The Spaceman and King Arthur (1979) as Senator Milburn
 The Amateur (1981) as Ambassador Neville
 Superman III (1983) as Tanker Captain
 Labyrinth (1986) as Left Door Knocker (voice)
 Superman IV: The Quest for Peace (1987) as U.S. President

References

External links
 
 Robert Beatty Obituary in The New York Times

1909 births
1992 deaths
University of Toronto alumni
Alumni of RADA
Burials at Putney Vale Cemetery
Canadian male film actors
Canadian male television actors
Canadian male radio actors
Canadian male stage actors
Canadian male voice actors
20th-century Canadian male actors
Male actors from Hamilton, Ontario
Canadian expatriate male actors in the United Kingdom